On July 27, 2007,  two AS-350 AStar helicopters from television stations KNXV-TV and KTVK collided in mid-air over Phoenix, Arizona, while covering a police pursuit. On board the two aircraft were four people in total – pilot Craig Smith and photographer Rick Krolak from KNXV-TV, and pilot Scott Bowerbank and photographer Jim Cox from KTVK – all of whom were killed, while no casualties were reported on the ground.

Accident
KNXV was the area's ABC affiliate, while KTVK was an independent news station, formerly an ABC affiliate itself; both stations had switched their affiliations after longtime CBS affiliate KSAZ-TV affiliated with Fox in December 1994. The two helicopters were broadcasting a police pursuit live when the collision occurred, at 12:46:18 p.m. MST. Both aircraft came down in the Steele Indian School Park, central Phoenix.

Three other news helicopters from some of the city's other stations (KSAZ, KPNX, and KPHO) were in the area and within seconds began reporting on the crash. A photograph taken moments after the collision and showing both helicopters plunging towards the ground was circulated by AP.

Aftermath and investigation
The collision was investigated by the National Transportation Safety Board (NTSB), which concluded that "...the probable cause of this accident was both pilots' failure to see and avoid the other helicopter. Contributing to this failure was the pilots' responsibility to perform reporting and visual tracking duties to support their station's electronic news gathering (ENG) operation. Contributing to the accident was the lack of formal procedures for Phoenix-area ENG pilots to follow regarding the conduct of these operations."

The day of the accident, Phoenix Police Chief Jack Harris brought up the possibility that the suspect in the chase the two helicopters were covering could "be held responsible for any of the deaths from this tragedy". However, in 2010, when the suspect pleaded guilty to 35 crimes stemming from the 2007 police chase, he was not charged with the deaths of the helicopter occupants.

Two years after the accident, the families of pilot Scott Bowerbank and photographer Jim Cox announced that a settlement for an undisclosed amount was agreed to with US Helicopters, the owners of the Channel 15 helicopter. Both legal teams released a video reconstructing details of the accident. The computer generated footage simulates the Channel 3 (KTVK) helicopter being struck from behind by the Channel 15 (KNXV) helicopter.

Legacy
At the time of the accident, five news helicopters were covering the police incident and specific protocols (called Sharp Echo) for radio communications between news helicopters and Phoenix control tower were already in force in an attempt to coordinate their activity.

As of 2022, the five English-language television stations in Phoenix use one helicopter, which is shared by KTVK, KPHO, KNXV, KSAZ, and KPNX. In neither operation do pilots perform reporting duties. Additionally, technological improvements such as long-range camera lenses allow helicopters to stay farther back from news stories.

See also
 List of news aircraft accidents and incidents

References

External links

 Picture of N215TV at airport-data.com
 Picture of N613TV at airport-data.com

2007 in Arizona
2000s in Phoenix, Arizona
Accidents and incidents involving the Eurocopter AS350
History of mass media in the United States
Aviation accidents and incidents in Arizona
Aviation accidents and incidents in the United States in 2007
Aviation accidents and incidents caused by pilot error
Mid-air collisions
Mid-air collisions involving helicopters
History of law enforcement in the United States
July 2007 events in the United States